KCYZ (105.1 FM branded as "Now 105.1") is a commercial radio station located in Ames, Iowa, broadcasting to the Des Moines, Iowa area.  KCYZ airs a hot adult contemporary music format branded as "Now 105.1".  KCYZ is owned by iHeartMedia and licensed to Citicaster Licenses LP. Its studios are located on Main Street in Ames, while its transmitter is located just north of Ames on West 190th Street.

History
Prior to the switch to Alternative rock, the station was known as "Hot 105 KCCQ" with a Top 40/CHR format. Many years in the 1990s, KCCQ was the only contemporary hit radio station broadcasting in central Iowa, including the Des Moines metro area. Much of the history of KCCQ prior to 1990 is unknown. Since it signed on in 1968, KCCQ had several contemporary format incarnations throughout the 1970s and 1980s. The signal in Des Moines itself was relatively weak prior to 1998 when the station moved frequencies to 105.1 from 107.1 and the wattage was increased. Much of the time the station occupied 107.1, listeners in Des Moines and other parts of the southern fringe of KCCQ's coverage area could often hear interference from KJJC of Osceola, which was broadcasting at 106.9 with higher wattage than KCCQ.

Previous to 1998, the station only targeted the Ames, Iowa area and was known as "Hot 107 KCCQ" and before that "107 KCCQ Ames' Hot FM". Ames Broadcasting Company owned KCCQ along with KASI in Ames, and KIKD-FM in Lake City until 1999 when KASI and KCCQ were sold to Jacor, which, at the time recently merged with Clear Channel Communications.

After the purchase by Clear Channel, the company swapped KCCQ's CHR format with the alternative rock format of new sister station KKDM. KCCQ was then known as "Channel Q". The station also boosted its broadcast power to cover more of central Iowa, though it still only provides grade B coverage to Des Moines itself. In August 2010, KCCQ rebranded as "New Rock 105.1". On December 26, 2013, at Midnight, KCCQ swapped formats with sister station KPTL and began broadcasting a Hot AC format, while its alternative rock format moved to 106.3.

On April 4, 2014, KCCQ changed their call letters to KCYZ. Clear Channel would also change their name on September 16, 2014, renaming themselves iHeartMedia.

KCYZ is Ames' FM home for Iowa State Cyclones football and men's basketball, simulcasting with sister station KASI.

References
 Roepke D (1999) Two local radio stations sold for unspecified price Iowa State Daily 6/29/1999 p1.
 Heman B (1999) Carroll Broadcasting Co. announces bid for KIKD Daily Times Herald 2/4/1999 pp 1.

External links
Official website

CYZ
Radio stations established in 1968
IHeartMedia radio stations